Love & Hate is the eighth studio album by Mexican-American Chicano rap recording artist Lil Rob from San Diego, California. It was released on September 29, 2009 through Upstairs Records with distribution via Fontana Distribution. The album peaked at number 158 on the Billboard 200 albums chart in the United States.

Track listing

Chart history

References

External links
 Love and Hate by Lil Rob on iTunes

2009 albums
Lil Rob albums